The 1955 college football season saw the Oklahoma Sooners win the national championship after going 10–0–0.  Although the final poll was taken before the postseason bowl games, Oklahoma played against the nation's other unbeaten and untied (10–0–0) team, the Maryland Terrapins, at the Orange Bowl in Miami, and won 20–6.

During the 20th century, the NCAA had no playoff for the college football teams that would later be described as "Division I-A".  The NCAA did recognize a national champion based upon the final results of "wire service" (AP and UPI) polls.  The extent of that recognition came in the form of acknowledgment in the annual NCAA Football Guide of the "unofficial" national champions.  The AP poll in 1955 consisted of the votes of as many as 391 sportswriters.  Though not all writers voted in every poll, each would give their opinion of the twenty best teams.  Under a point system of 20 points for first place, 19 for second, etc., the "overall" ranking was determined.  Although the rankings were based on the collective opinion of the representative sportswriters, the teams that remained "unbeaten and untied" were generally ranked higher than those that had not.  A defeat, even against a strong opponent, tended to cause a team to drop in the rankings, and a team with two or more defeats was unlikely to remain in the Top 20.  Generally, the top teams played on New Year's Day in the four major postseason bowl games: the Rose Bowl (near Los Angeles at Pasadena), the Sugar Bowl (New Orleans), the Orange Bowl (Miami), and the Cotton Bowl (Dallas).

Conference and program changes

Conference changes
One conference began play in 1955:
Presidents' Athletic Conference – an active NCAA Division III conference
One conference played its final season in 1955:
Texas Collegiate Athletic Conference – active since the 1926 season
One conference changed its name prior to the 1955 season:
The New Mexico Intercollegiate Conference became the Frontier Conference, the name it retained until its demise after the 1962 season

Membership changes

September
In the preseason poll released on September 12, 1955, the UCLA Bruins, 1954's co-champions, received 33 first place votes, while Oklahoma had 32.  Michigan had 34 votes, but the third most points overall.  Other teams nominated for the top spot were defending AP champ Ohio State, Maryland, Notre Dame, Navy, Miami, Georgia Tech, Iowa, USC, Duke, West Virginia, and Purdue.  As the regular season progressed, a new poll would be issued on the Monday following the weekend's games.   The preseason Top Five were No. 1 UCLA, No. 2 Oklahoma, No. 3 Michigan, No. 4 Ohio State, and No. 5 Maryland.

On Friday, September 16, No. 1 UCLA opened in Los Angeles with a 21–0 win over visiting Texas A&M.  September 17, Oklahoma, Michigan and Ohio State were idle, but No. 5 Maryland edged Missouri on the road, 13–12.  No. 10 Georgia Tech, which had beaten No. 9 Miami 14–6 in Atlanta, rose to 2nd place in the next poll: No. 1 UCLA, No. 2 Georgia Tech, No. 3 Oklahoma, No. 4 Michigan, and No. 5 Maryland.

On September 24, No. 1 UCLA and No. 5 Maryland met at College Park, before a record crowd.  UCLA's Doug Peters plunged into the end zone in the first half, but fumbled the ball before crossing the goal line.  In the second half, the home team Terrapins had the ball 17 yards from goal, on fourth down.  Rather than kicking a field goal, Ed Vereb ran for the winning touchdown, giving Maryland a 7–0 win. No. 2 Georgia Tech won at No. 19 Florida, 14–7.  No. 3 Oklahoma won at North Carolina 13–6.  No. 4 Michigan beat Missouri 42–7.  Maryland took over the top spot, while UCLA fell to 7th.  No. 11 Notre Dame, which had beaten SMU 17–0, moved into the Top 5: No. 1 Maryland, No. 2 Michigan, No. 3 Georgia Tech, No. 4 Notre Dame, and No. 5 Oklahoma.

October

October 1, 
No. 1 Maryland won 20–6 at No. 20 Baylor in Texas.
No. 2 Michigan beat Michigan State 14–7 before a crowd of 97,239 at home in Ann Arbor.  MSU had tied the score 7–7 after an errant punt by Michigan gave them the ball 39 yards from goal.  Minutes later, Earl Morrall's punt was blocked to give Michigan the ball on the MSU 21, from which the winning score was made.  No. 3 Georgia Tech beat SMU 20–7 in Atlanta.
No. 4 Notre Dame defeated Indiana 19–0.
No. 5 Oklahoma beat No. 12 Pittsburgh 26–14, marking its 21st consecutive win.  The next poll: No. 1 Maryland, No. 2 Michigan, No. 3 Oklahoma, No. 4 Georgia Tech, and No. 5 Notre Dame.

October 8
No. 1 Maryland beat Wake Forest 28–7, and No. 2 Michigan defeated visiting No. 6 Army, 26–2.  Both stayed unbeaten, but Michigan took the top spot in the next poll.  No. 3 Oklahoma defeated Texas 20–0 in Dallas.
No. 4 Georgia Tech won 7–0 at LSU.
No. 5 Notre Dame won 14–0 at No. 15 Miami, with both touchdowns coming on fourth down passes from Paul Hornung, before an Orange Bowl record crowd of 75,685.  In a game that would eventually decide the Pacific Coast Conference title, No. 7 UCLA beat Oregon State 38–0.  The next poll: No. 1 Michigan, No. 2 Maryland, No. 3 Oklahoma, No. 4 Notre Dame, and No. 5 Georgia Tech.

October 15 No. 1 Michigan defeated Northwestern, 14–2.  No. 2 Maryland won at North Carolina, 25–7.   No. 3 Oklahoma beat Kansas 44–6.  However, No. 5 Georgia Tech lost to visiting  No. 17 Auburn 14–12, and No. 4 Notre Dame lost 21–7 when it hosted No. 13 Michigan State.  They dropped from the top five and were replaced by No. 8 Navy (which had won 34–14 at Penn State) and No. 11 Duke (which had won at No. 14 Ohio State, 20–14).  The poll: No. 1 Michigan, No. 2 Maryland, No. 3 Oklahoma, No. 4 Navy, and No. 5 Duke.

October 22 In Minneapolis, No. 1 Michigan faced a 1–3–0 Minnesota team and was stunned when the Gophers racked up two touchdowns in the first quarter.  Michigan's Terry Barr blocked the extra point attempt on the second touchdown, but the nation's No. 1 team was losing 13–0.  Still down 13–7 at the half, the Wolverines fought back.  Jim Van Pelt passed to Tom Maentz for a touchdown, and Van Pelt added the extra point to save Michigan, 14–13.  Minnesota would go on to a 3–6–0 finish.   Meanwhile, No. 2 Maryland won more convincingly at Syracuse, 34–13, to regain the top spot.  No. 3 Oklahoma beat No. 14 Colorado, 56–21.  No. 4 Navy won at Penn, 33–0.  No. 5 Duke lost to Pitt, 26–7, and was replaced in the top five by No. 6 Michigan State, which beat Illinois 21–7. The next poll: No. 1 Maryland, No. 2 Oklahoma, No. 3 Michigan, No. 4 Navy, and No. 5 Michigan State.

October 29 Back at the top, No. 1 Maryland beat South Carolina 27–0, while No. 2 Oklahoma won at Kansas State, 40–7.  No. 3 Michigan beat Iowa 33–21. No. 4 Navy lost at No. 9 Notre Dame, 21–7.  No. 5 Michigan State won at Wisconsin, 27–0.  UCLA returned to the Top Five from No. 6 after a 47–0 win over California. The next poll: No. 1 Maryland, No. 2 Oklahoma, No. 3 Michigan, No. 4 Michigan State, and No. 5 UCLA.

November
November 5 As both stayed undefeated, No. 1 Maryland beat LSU 13–0 and No. 2 Oklahoma won at Missouri, 20–0.  
No. 3 Michigan lost at Illinois 25–6, while No. 4 Michigan State won at Purdue, 27–0.  No. 5 UCLA won at Pacific, 34–0.  No. 6 Notre Dame, which had won at Penn 46–14, returned to the top five. The next poll: No. 1 Oklahoma, No. 2 Maryland, No. 3 Michigan State, No. 4 UCLA, and No. 5.Notre Dame.

November 12 Back at No. 1, Oklahoma beat Iowa State 52–0.  No. 2 Maryland won at Clemson, 25–12.  No. 3 Michigan State beat Minnesota 42–14.  No. 4 UCLA was trailing Washington 17–16 in the closing seconds, but Jim Decker kicked a field goal for a 19–17 victory. The game is referenced in Back to the Future Part II. No. 5 Notre Dame won at North Carolina, 27–7.  The next poll: No. 1 Oklahoma, No. 2 Maryland, No. 3 Michigan State, No. 4 Notre Dame, and No. 5 UCLA.

November 19 Although No. 1 Oklahoma was 8–0–0 and host Nebraska was 5–4–0, both had 5–0–0 records in Big 7 conference play when they met at Lincoln.  The Sooners rolled, 41–0, to get the Orange Bowl bid.  No. 2 Maryland closed its season with a 19–0 win over George Washington University and accepted the invitation to meet Oklahoma, but what would have been a No. 1 vs. No. 2 meeting changed when the Terrapins were dropped to third by the AP voters.  No. 3 Michigan State, which had a 5–1 record in Big Ten play, beat Marquette 33–0 in a non-conference game. No. 6 Michigan's 17–0 loss to No. 9 Ohio State gave the Wolverines a 5–2 conference mark and knocked them out of contention for the Rose Bowl.  Ohio State had the best record in the Big Ten, 6–0 overall, but had gone to the Rose Bowl the year before, so Michigan State got the bid. The Spartans' opponent would be No. 5 UCLA, which beat USC 17–7.  No. 4 Notre Dame beat Iowa 17–14.  Though Maryland, like Oklahoma, was unbeaten, the voters put once-beaten Michigan State in the second spot instead.  The next poll: No. 1 Oklahoma, No. 2 Michigan State, No. 3 Maryland, No. 4 UCLA, and No. 5 Notre Dame.   

On November 26, No. 5 Notre Dame lost in Los Angeles to USC, 42–20, and dropped to 6th in the final AP poll, where it would be replaced at No. 5 by Ohio State.  The top four teams (Oklahoma, Michigan State, Maryland, and UCLA) had finished their seasons and were ranked in the same order in the final poll.

Conference standings

Major conference standings

Independents

Minor conferences

Minor conference standings

Rankings

Final AP Poll
The final rankings were made on November 28, after the regular season and without consideration of the postseason bowl games:

Final Coaches Poll

Other champions

Orange Blossom Classic
Prior to the integration of sports teams, Miami Orange Bowl stadium hosted the New Year's Day game of the same name, and a December game for historically black colleges, the Orange Blossom Classic.  Grambling State (9–0–0) and Florida A & M University (8–0–1) met to determine the best Negro college football team in the nation, with Grambling winning 28–21.

Undefeated programs
Miami University (Ohio) finished 9–0–0, as did Southeast Missouri State University, Heidelberg College, Hillsdale College, College of Emporia, Maryland State College and Whitworth College.  Northern State Teachers College* of South Dakota went 9–0–0, and then lost to Kearney Teachers College in the "Botany Bowl", 34–13, played in Shenandoah, Iowa, on Thanksgiving Day.

Colleges that went 8–0–0 were Alfred University, Drexel University, Albany State College, Centre College, Coe College, Parsons College, Juniata College, Muskingum College, Shepherd College, and Stevens Point College.   (7).  Trinity College (Connecticut) went 7–0–0.

Bowl games

Major bowls
Monday, January 2, 1956

Other bowls

Statistical leaders
Player scoring most points: Jim Swink, TCU, 125.

Heisman Trophy voting
The Heisman Trophy is given to the year's most outstanding player

See also
1955 College Football All-America Team

References